The following is a list of governors of the Mexican state of Jalisco from 1821. The current Constitution indicates a term six years in length, which cannot be renewed under any circumstances. It also stipulates the qualifications for becoming governor: a Mexican citizen by birth, at least 30 years of age, and a resident of Jalisco for at least five years prior to election. Elections are held concurrently with presidential elections.

List of governors

Rulers of the Province of Nueva Galicia during Independent Mexico (1821–1823)

Rulers of the State of Jalisco during Independent Mexico (1823–1836)

Governors of Jalisco, Centralism and Federalism (1836–1857)

Rulers of Jalisco during the Reform and the Second Empire, until the Restored Republic (1857–1867)

Governors of Jalisco since the Restored Republic until 1877 (1867–1877)

Governors of the State of Jalisco during the Porfiriato (1877–1911)

Governors of the State of Jalisco during the Mexican Revolution (1911–1920)

Governors of the Free and Sovereign State of Jalisco (1920-until the present)

See also
 List of Mexican state governors

References

Jalisco